Ingalls House is a historic house museum at 210 3rd Street Southwest in De Smet, South Dakota. The house was a childhood home to the author Laura Ingalls Wilder.

After living in the surveyor's house in town in 1879-80 and then homesteading for several years, Charles Phillip Ingalls constructed this town house in 1887, and it was occupied by the family until 1928. It features many furnishings crafted by Mr. Ingalls.  The Laura Ingalls Wilder Memorial Society purchased the house in 1967 and opened it to the public the next year.

The bodies of Charles, Caroline, Mary, Carrie, and Grace Ingalls, and the unnamed infant son of Laura and Almanzo Wilder are buried nearby in the De Smet Cemetery a little over a mile away.

The house was added to the National Register of Historic Places in 1975.

When the Ingalls lived there, fruit trees filled up the back yard and a vegetable garden was in the adjacent lot.  Also a barn and a sand-point pump were in constant use.

See also
Laura Ingalls Wilder House, Mansfield, Missouri

References

External links
 Laura Ingalls Wilder Memorial Society

Laura Ingalls Wilder
Ingalls family residences
Houses on the National Register of Historic Places in South Dakota
Houses completed in 1887
Houses in Kingsbury County, South Dakota
De Smet, South Dakota
Museums in Kingsbury, South Dakota
National Register of Historic Places in Kingsbury County, South Dakota